Danny José Tenorio Ortíz (born December 22, 1992) is an Ecuadorian free agent footballer who most recently played as a midfielder for Forward Madison FC in USL League One.

Career

Forward Madison
In November 2018, Madison joined Forward Madison FC ahead of their inaugural season in USL League One, becoming the club's second-ever player in the process. He made his professional debut for the club on June 22, 2019, coming on in the 87th minute for J. C. Banks in a 4–1 victory over North Texas SC.

References

External links
Profile at Forward Madison Website

1992 births
Living people
Forward Madison FC players
USL League One players
Ecuadorian footballers
Association football midfielders